A diplomatic crisis began between the countries of Kuwait and the Philippines in early 2018 over concerns of the latter over the situation of Filipino migrant workers in the gulf country.

The diplomatic row was a result of the discovery of the corpse of Joanna Demafelis, a Filipino domestic worker working in Kuwait which has been inside an abandoned warehouse since November 2016. In response to the discovery, President Rodrigo Duterte ordered the suspension of deployment of Filipino migrant workers to Kuwait and organized a voluntary repatriation program for Filipinos already working in Kuwait. The move was criticized by the Kuwaiti government but both the Philippines and Kuwait went on to cooperate regarding the Demafelis murder case leading to the conviction of Demafelis' killers in absentia as well as improve the working conditions of Filipino migrant workers in Kuwait in general.

However, relations were further strained in late April after a video emerged showing Philippine embassy officials purportedly rescuing Filipino maids from allegedly abusive employers. Kuwait called the operations as a violation of its sovereignty, expelled the Philippine Ambassador to Kuwait and recalled its own envoy in Manila.

Background

A diplomatic crisis between Kuwait and the Philippines began when the killing of Joanna Demafelis, a Filipino domestic worker working in Kuwait, came to public attention in 2018.

The Philippine Department of Labor and Employment directed its staff to stop processing deployment certificates to Filipinos seeking to work on Kuwait on January 19, 2018, following a series of death of Filipino domestic workers mentioned by President Rodrigo Duterte in a speech the day before. Duterte has requested for a total ban of Filipino worker deployment to Kuwait.

The case of Demafelis was the particular incident that resulted to the ban. Demafelis had been killed two years earlier and her death only came to public attention when her corpse was found inside a freezer in a warehouse abandoned since November 2016.

It was on February 12, 2018, that DOLE officially enforced a deployment ban of Filipino migrant workers in Kuwait. It was clarified that seafarers boarding from Kuwait, rehired workers who would be returning to the gulf country, and tourists are exempted from the ban.

In addition to the deployment ban, the Philippine government has offered Filipino workers already in Kuwait to be voluntarily repatriated.

There are around 250,000 Filipinos working in Kuwait, 65 percent of which are domestic helpers, according to the Philippine embassy in 2018.

Developments

Kuwaiti government response
The Kuwaiti government has criticized the migrant worker ban imposed by the Philippines in gulf country and has stated that all cases of alleged abuse against Filipino migrant workers are being handled by its laws. The National Assembly of Kuwait has discussed the situation of the Filipino migrant workers in the country.

On April 3, 2018, the Kuwait government announced that it aims to recruit more Ethiopians as domestic workers to compensate for deficit in the labor force caused by its diplomatic row with the Philippines.

Repatriation of Filipino workers

By the end of March 2018, 4,000 Filipino workers has been voluntarily repatriated from Kuwait and the Philippine government is negotiating with Kuwait for the repatriation of 6,000 more workers

Demafelis murder case
Lebanese man Nader Essam Assaf, and his Syrian wife were accused for the killing of Demafelis. With the help of Interpol the two were detained in the Syrian capital of Damascus in February 2018. The Syrian government handed custody of Assaf to Lebanon while Assaf's wife remained in Syria. On April 1, 2018, a Kuwaiti court convicted the couple of murder and sentenced them to death by hanging. They were tried in absentia.

April 21 Philippine embassy operation
Relations between the two countries became more strained when a video emerged depicting operations of Philippine embassy officials purportedly rescuing Filipino maids from alleged abusive employers. The operation conducted on April 21, 2018, was seen by Kuwait as a "flagrant" violation of its sovereignty. Filipino diplomats in the Philippines insist that the operations were not clandestine. Two embassy staff members were alleged to have encourage Filipino migrant workers to leave their employers.

The Philippine government on April 24 apologized for the incident saying it acknowledges Kuwait has its own laws while maintaining that the welfare of Filipino migrant workers are also within its interest. The following day, Kuwait declared Philippine Ambassador Renato Villa persona non grata demanding Villa to leave the gulf country within the week, and recalled its envoy in Manila for consultations. The Philippines called the move "deeply disturbing" and said that Kuwait "reneged" on an earlier agreement to cooperate. Kuwait arrested four drivers and three diplomats involved in the operation and pressed charges against them.

Following a meeting between officials of the two countries, the four drivers involved were released and the charges against them were dropped.

Agreement

Negotiations
Authorities from both countries have been engaged in talks to defuse diplomatic tensions. On February 14, 2018, the governments of Kuwait and the Philippines announced they come to consensus to sign an agreement on working conditions regulations. Philippine president Rodrigo Duterte has also been invited to make a state visit to Kuwait.

Duterte, on March 6, laid two conditions for the labor deployment ban on Kuwait to be lifted; the signing of a Memorandum of Understanding on labor policies between Kuwait and the Philippines, and that "justice be served" in regards to the death of Joanna Demafelis. On March 16, a draft agreement was accomplished by officials from the two countries and was expected to be signed in Kuwait in two weeks.

Despite Kuwait's action on the Philippine Ambassador and its own envoy in Manila, Philippine Foreign Secretary Alan Peter Cayetano stated on April 25, that the agreement is now planned to be signed in the Philippines and the Kuwait government has followed-up regarding the agreement. Cayetano also encouraged Duterte to accept Kuwait's invitation to make a state visit to the Middle Eastern country.

However, President Rodrigo Duterte shortly declared that the labor deployment ban as "permanent". Duterte also said that the signing of the labor agreement with Kuwait will not push through and that he will not make a visit to the gulf country. Harry Roque, the Philippine presidential spokesperson later contradicted Duterte's statement saying that the ban is not "permanent" and may still be lifted.

Signing

The memorandum of agreement (MoU) entitled "Agreement on the Employment of Domestic Workers" between the Philippines and Kuwait was signed by representatives of Kuwait and the Philippines on May 11, 2018.

The two countries had a consensus on labor matters which covered all migrant domestic workers in Kuwait regardless of their nationality. Under the deal, certain rights of migrant workers were recognized: They can't have their passports and other travel documents kept by their employers; and they have the right to use their mobile phones. Workers are now also entitled to be provided food, housing, clothing, and health insurance by their employers and at least a day off from work each week.

Filipino workers can't be a transferred to another employer without the consent of the worker or approval from the Philippine Overseas Employment Administration (POEA). Contract renewals which used to be automatic now had to be subject to approval of the POEA.

Aftermath of the deal signing
Philippine Foreign Affairs Secretary Alan Peter Cayetano has announced that a new Philippine Ambassador to Kuwait will be appointed and that he will advised Philippine President Rodrigo Duterte to lift the deployment ban of Filipino workers to Kuwait. Duterte on his part has stated that he is open to lifting the ban following the signing of the deal.

On May 12, 2018, a partial lifting of the ban was announced by the Philippine government allowing the deployment of "skilled" and "semi-skilled" workers to Kuwait and Philippine Presidential spokesperson Harry Roque has stated that relations between the two countries has normalized. Duterte ordered the deployment ban to be fully lifted on May 16 and on May 22 he declared that his country's relation with Kuwait is now "okay".

Killing of Villavende
The killing of another Filipino worker Jeanelyn Villavende in December 2019 tested Kuwaiti–Philippine relations. While a partial deployment ban was imposed by the Philippines for Filipino workers seeking to work in the Gulf state, Philippine President Rodrigo Duterte said that the response of Kuwaiti authorities to the case is more satisfactory this time with the suspect of Villavende's case already detained. However, there are calls to impose more stringent deployment restrictions after Kuwaiti authorities are accused of whitewashing the case since the autopsy report they sent to their Philippine counterparts only showed the possible cause of death of Villavende and a separate autopsy by the Philippine National Bureau of Investigation (NBI) suggests that the Filipino worker may have also been raped. The NBI report convinced Philippine Labor secretary Silvestre Bello to threaten to impose a total deployment ban of Filipino workers to Kuwait.

The total deployment ban of workers to Kuwait will remain in effect “until we get justice for Ms [Jeanelyn] Villavende and a consensus on the standard employment contract,” Labor Secretary Silvestre Bello III said in a press briefing on Thursday.

“If we cannot get that, there will be no deployment. It has to be simultaneous,” Bello added of the ban approved on Wednesday in a Philippine Overseas Employment Administration (POEA) resolution.

See also
Kuwait–Philippines relations, general international relations between the two countries
Sondos Alqattan, critic of the agreement on migrant domestic workers which ended the diplomatic crisis.

References

Kuwait–Philippines relations
Diplomatic incidents
Kuwait-Philippine crisis
Kuwait-Philippine crisis
Human rights abuses in Kuwait
Economic history of Kuwait
Migrant workers
Kuwait-Philippine diplomatic crisis